Agger Rockshelter is a prehistoric rock shelter located in Stevenstown, in La Crosse County, Wisconsin, United States. The shelter faces west and overlooks a tributary of the Black River. During the 1980s and 1990s the Mississippi Valley Archaeology Center conducted an extensive survey of the Driftless area which led to the discovery of unrecorded rock art.

Notes

References
 Birmingham, Robert A. Green, William (2006) The Minnesota archaeologist, Volumes 64-65 Social Science
 Birmingham, Robert A. Green, William (1987) The Wisconsin archeologist, Volume 68 Social Science

Geography of La Crosse County, Wisconsin
Archaeological sites on the National Register of Historic Places in Wisconsin
Rock shelters in the United States
National Register of Historic Places in La Crosse County, Wisconsin